Miriam Ausman Forman is an American astrophysicist known for her work on solar cosmic rays, turbulence and energy cascades in magnetohydrodynamics, and the solar wind.

Education and career
Forman entered graduate study at Stony Brook University in 1968, completed her Ph.D. there in 1972, and remained affiliated with Stony Brook as an adjunct faculty member, supported by grants from NASA, until 1985.

She worked as an administrator for the American Physical Society from 1985 until 1991, when she joined the NASA Space Physics Division, and became program scientist for Heliospheric Missions at NASA. She stepped down from that position in 1998, and was seconded from NASA to the White House for a year, then returned in 1999 to Stony Brook as adjunct faculty again.

Recognition
In 1984 Forman was named a Fellow of the American Physical Society (APS), after nomination by the APS Division of Astrophysics, "for fundamental contributions to the theory of propagation and acceleration of energetic particles in the solar system and for application of the theory in the interpretation of observation". She was chair of the Division of Astrophysics for 1986–1987.

In 2002 she was named a Fellow of the American Association for the Advancement of Science "for research and teaching in astrophysics, especially solar physics, and for valuable service to professional societies and the government on
behalf of science".

References

Year of birth missing (living people)
Living people
American physicists
American women physicists
Stony Brook University alumni
Fellows of the American Physical Society
Fellows of the American Association for the Advancement of Science
21st-century American women